In mobility management, the restricted random waypoint model is a random model for the movement of mobile users, similar to the random waypoint model, but where the waypoints are restricted to fall within one of a finite set of sub-domains. It was originally introduced by Blaževic et al. in order to model intercity examples and later defined in a more general setting by Le Boudec et al.

Definition 

The restricted random waypoint models the trajectory of a mobile user in a connected domain . In the restricted setting, the waypoints are restricted to fall within one of a finite set of subdomains .

The duration of the -th trip is thus:

The mobile may also pause at a waypoint, in which case the -th trip is a pause at the location of the -th waypoint, i.e. . A duration  is drawn from some distribution  to indicate the end of the pause.

The transition instants  are the time at which the mobile reaches the -th waypoint. They are defined as follow:

The sampling algorithm for the waypoints depends on the phase of the simulation.

An initial phase  is chosen according to some initialization rule.

  is the index of the current sub-domain .
  is the remaining number of waypoints to sample from this sub-domain .
  is the index of the next sub-domain.
 And  indicates whether the -th trip is a pause.

Given phase , the next phase  is chosen as follows. Otherwise, a new sub-domain  is sampled and a number  of trip to undergo in sub-domain  is sampled. The new phase is: .

Given a phase  the waypoint  is set to  if . Otherwise, it is sampled from sub-domain  if  and from sub-domain  if .

Transient and stationary period 

In a typical simulation models, when the condition for stability is satisfied, simulation runs go through a transient period and converge to the stationary regime. It is important to remove the transients for performing meaningful comparisons of, for example, different mobility regimes. A standard method for avoiding such a bias is to (i) make sure the used model has a stationary regime and (ii) remove the beginning of all simulation runs in the hope that long runs converge to stationary regime. However the length of transients may be prohibitively long for even simple mobility models and a major difficulty is to know when the transient ends.  An alternative, called "perfect simulation", is to sample the initial simulation state from the stationary regime.

There exists algorithms for perfect simulation of the general restricted random waypoint. They are described in Perfect simulation and stationarity of a class of mobility models (2005) and a Python implementation is available on GitHub.

References 

Wireless networking
GSM standard